Brett John Hudson (born 1965) is a New Zealand politician who was a Member of Parliament for the New Zealand National Party from 2014 to 2020.

Political career
Hudson stood in the 2011 election, but his rank of 73rd on National's party list meant he was not elected to Parliament. In 2014 election the National Party selected him to contest Ōhāriu against incumbent Peter Dunne of the United Future Party. While unsuccessful in his electorate, he was ranked 39th on National's 2014 party list, enough to become a list MP.

At the 2020 election Hudson lost Ōhāriu by nearly 12,000 votes, and was not placed high enough on National's list to return to Parliament as a list MP.

References

Living people
New Zealand National Party MPs
Members of the New Zealand House of Representatives
New Zealand list MPs
Place of birth missing (living people)
1965 births
Unsuccessful candidates in the 2011 New Zealand general election
21st-century New Zealand politicians
Candidates in the 2017 New Zealand general election
Candidates in the 2020 New Zealand general election
Unsuccessful candidates in the 2020 New Zealand general election